Carlos Alberto Yaqué (born 12 September 1971) is an Argentine former professional footballer who played as a forward.

Career
Almagro were the club who gave Yaqué his start in senior football, with the forward appearing for the team in Primera B Metropolitana between 1989 and 1992. Yaqué moved abroad for the first time in 1992, signing for Colombia's Real Cartagena of Categoría Primera A. He departed midway through the year after just one appearance, as the club went on to suffer relegation. Yaqué had returned to Argentina with Nueva Chicago. After spending 1992–93 with them, Yaqué returned to third tier Almagro in 1994. They won promotion to Primera B Nacional in his second campaign back. He remained there for one further season.

In 1997, Yaqué completed a move to Argentine Primera División side Ferro Carril Oeste. Nine goals in twenty-eight fixtures followed. 1998 saw Yaqué leave his homeland once more, agreeing terms with Reggina of the Italian Serie B. He left halfway into the 1998–99 season, signing for Estudiantes in early 1999. Yaqué stuck with Estudiantes until the middle of 2000, which was followed by him signing a contract with Universitario. He scored eight goals for the Peruvians, which preceded Argentinos Juniors becoming Yaqué's eighth club. His return to Argentina lasted until 2002, when Ecuador's L.D.U. Quito signed Yaqué.

Yaqué, having featured eighteen times and netted eight goals in the Ecuadorian Serie A, had a stint in European football for the second time in 2003, after spending time with Ceuta in Segunda División B - scoring five times in twelve matches. A move to Huracán sealed a return to Argentina, where he would stay for the rest of his career. Thirty appearances with Huracán came, before Yaqué experienced 2004–05 with Defensores de Belgrano in tier two; though it would end with relegation. He rejoined Almagro for a third time in 2005, prior to having spells with Villa Mitre and Los Andes; who he'd score twenty-one goals for.

After being sent off in his final appearance for Los Andes, Yaqué joined Almagro for a fourth time in 2009. He took his overall league tally for Almagro to two hundred and thirty-two games and one hundred and fifty-five goals - including ten goals in 2009–10, where he netted against former teams Los Andes and Nueva Chicago. Yaqué also scored home and away that season in fixtures with Comunicaciones, a club he would later join in 2011. However, prior to that, Yaqué played for Sarmiento - he found the net four times for the Junín outfit. The final goal of his career came on 22 August 2011 during a defeat to Brown.

Personal life
Yaqué's sons, Nahuel and Nicolás, are professional footballers; they both played for Almagro at differing levels within the club. Since retirement, Yaqué has worked as an agent; including for Lautaro Martínez.

Career statistics

References

External links

1971 births
Living people
Yaqué family
Footballers from Buenos Aires
Argentine footballers
Association football forwards
Argentine expatriate footballers
Expatriate footballers in Colombia
Expatriate footballers in Italy
Expatriate footballers in Peru
Expatriate footballers in Ecuador
Expatriate footballers in Spain
Argentine expatriate sportspeople in Colombia
Argentine expatriate sportspeople in Italy
Argentine expatriate sportspeople in Peru
Argentine expatriate sportspeople in Ecuador
Argentine expatriate sportspeople in Spain
Primera B Metropolitana players
Categoría Primera A players
Primera Nacional players
Argentine Primera División players
Serie B players
Peruvian Primera División players
Ecuadorian Serie A players
Segunda División B players
Club Almagro players
Real Cartagena footballers
Nueva Chicago footballers
Ferro Carril Oeste footballers
Reggina 1914 players
Estudiantes de La Plata footballers
Club Universitario de Deportes footballers
Argentinos Juniors footballers
L.D.U. Quito footballers
AD Ceuta footballers
Club Atlético Huracán footballers
Defensores de Belgrano footballers
Villa Mitre footballers
Club Atlético Los Andes footballers
Club Atlético Sarmiento footballers
Club Comunicaciones footballers